The Trials of Oscar Wilde, also known as The Man with the Green Carnation and The Green Carnation, is a 1960 British drama film based on the libel and subsequent criminal cases involving Oscar Wilde and the Marquess of Queensberry. It was written by Allen and Ken Hughes, directed by Hughes, and co-produced by Irving Allen, Albert R. Broccoli and Harold Huth. The screenplay was by Ken Hughes and Montgomery Hyde, based on an unperformed play The Stringed Lute by John Furnell (the pseudonym of Phyllis Macqueen).  The film was made by Warwick Films and released by Eros Films.

It stars Peter Finch as Wilde, Lionel Jeffries as Queensberry, and John Fraser as Bosie (Lord Alfred Douglas) with James Mason, Nigel Patrick, Yvonne Mitchell, Maxine Audley, Paul Rogers and James Booth.

Cast
Peter Finch as Oscar Wilde
Yvonne Mitchell as Constance Wilde
Sonia Dresdel as Lady Wilde
Emrys Jones as Robbie Ross
Lionel Jeffries as Marquis of Queensbury
James Mason as Sir Edward Carson
Nigel Patrick as Sir Edward Clarke
John Fraser as Lord Alfred Douglas
Maxine Audley as Ada Leverson
Ian Fleming as Arthur
Laurence Naismith as the Prince of Wales
James Booth as Alfred Wood
Michael Goodliffe as Charles Gill
Naomi Chance as Lillie Langtry

Production
In November 1959, Ken Hughes said he hoped for Laurence Olivier or Alec Guinness to play the title role. "I know American actors who would run a mile rather than play a part like this, but the film will be a flop unless Wilde is played by someone of stature," said Hughes. "We are going to have some stiff legal problems. We shall approach the Queensberry family. The Marquis will be shown as the villain and I don't know how his family will like that. As for Wilde, the film will show him deserving pity, a genius living in a superficial fantasy world."

Vyvyan Holland (Wilde's son) said "the film company has not approached me. I should be very glad to act as advisor although I cannot say I would approve until I have seen the script.

In February 1960, it was announced Peter Finch would play the role for a fee of £25,000. "I'm scared stiff," said Finch. "Mind you the fact it's such a challenge is one reason I'm so keen. It's exciting to do something everybody says you can't."

It was one of two films about Wilde released in 1960, the other being 20th Century Fox' Oscar Wilde starring Robert Morley. According to production designer Ken Adam, producer Irving Allen set up four editing rooms for the production, working in parallel during principal photography; the setup permitted the film on the screen in the West End seven weeks after they had started filming. The production was filmed in Technirama.

Release
The film was released at midnight on Saturday, 28 May 1960 at Studio One in London before its general release on 30 May 1960. It was released a week after Oscar Wilde. Producers of both films originally refused to change their movie titles. Eventually, after confusion at various cinemas, Warwick announced they would release The Trials of Oscar Wilde as The Green Carnation.

Reception

Critical
In his review of the film, Bosley Crowther wrote: "Mr. Wilde himself could not have expected his rare personality or his unfortunate encounters with British justice on a morals charge to have been more sympathetically or affectingly dramatized.  In comparison to that other British picture about the same subject that opened [in New York City] last week, this one is more impressive in every respect, save one." Crowther concludes the review saying "The only thing is you wonder if this is a fairly true account, if Mr. Wilde was as noble and heroic as he is made to appear. And if he was, what was he doing with those cheap and shady young men? It looks to us as if they are trying to whitewash a most unpleasant case, which is one of the more notorious and less ennobling in literary history."

John Simon described The Trials of Oscar Wilde as "an unjustly neglected movie".

Variety magazine, commenting on the performances, said "Peter Finch gives a moving and subtle performance as the ill-starred playwright. Before his downfall he gives the man the charm that he undoubtedly had....John Fraser as handsome young Lord Alfred Douglas is suitably vain, selfish, vindictive and petulant and the relationship between the two is more understandable. Where Trials suffers in comparison with the B&W film is in the remarkable impact of the libel case court sequence. James Mason never provides the strength and bitter logic necessary for the dramatic cut-and-thrust when Wilde is in the witness box."

The film has been called "Hughes' one undeniable classic."

Box Office
Kine Weekly called it a "money maker" at the British box office in 1960.

Accolades

Influence
The film was the inspiration for a promotional film made for the Rolling Stones song "We Love You"; the 1967 film, directed by Peter Whitehead, featured Mick Jagger as Wilde, Keith Richards as the Marquis, and Marianne Faithfull as Bosie.

See also
 Gross Indecency: The Three Trials of Oscar Wilde, 1997 play based on the same legal proceedings

References

External links

1960 films
1960s biographical drama films
British biographical drama films
British historical films
British legal films
British LGBT-related films
1960s English-language films
British courtroom films
LGBT-related films based on actual events
Biographical films about writers
Films set in the Victorian era
Films set in London
Cultural depictions of Oscar Wilde
Films directed by Ken Hughes
Films produced by Albert R. Broccoli
Films scored by Ron Goodwin
Films shot at Associated British Studios
Biographical films about poets
1960 drama films
Eros Films films
1960s British films
Biographical films about LGBT people